Bear Bovver is a platform game written by Jon Ritman for the ZX Spectrum and published in 1983 by Artic Computing. A Commodore 64 port was released in 1984.  Bear Bovver is a BurgerTime clone, where batteries take the place of the burger ingredients.

Gameplay
Ted's Sinclair electric truck has broken down and needs new batteries. Ted must climb up the scaffolding and collect the batteries for his electric car.  However, there are bovver bears around the site and if they get near, they will capture him. To get rid of them, Ted must use time bombs that are scattered around the site. Once all the batteries for the car he been collected, the player moves on to the next level.

The game also includes "Baby Bear Mode" in which a player can collect batteries and move around the site without ever getting captured.

Development 
After seeing BurgerTime and hearing that Sinclair were talking about the release of an electric car, Jon Ritman decided to combine the concepts to create Bear Bovver. He began to use a more complex development system, joining 2 Spectrums and 3 Microdrives. He developed on one Spectrum and tested the game on the other. This allowed the games being developed to be larger.

References

External links
 
 

1983 video games
Artic Computing games
Commodore 64 games
Platform games
Single-player video games
Video game clones
Video games about bears
Video games developed in the United Kingdom
ZX Spectrum games